Ronald Campbell Gunn, FRS, (4 April 1808 – 13 March 1881) was a South African-born Australian botanist and politician.

Early life
Gunn was born at Cape Town, Cape Colony, (now South Africa), the son of William Gunn, lieutenant in the 72nd Regiment, and his wife Margaret, née Wilson. Gunn accompanied his father to Mauritius, the West Indies, and Scotland where he was educated. Gunn was given an appointment in the Royal Engineers at Barbados, but left there in 1829 to go to Van Diemen's Land (now Tasmania), where he obtained the position of superintendent of convict barracks at Hobart Town.

Career
In 1830 Gunn became superintendent of convicts for North Tasmania at Launceston. In 1831 Gunn became acquainted with an early Tasmanian botanist, Robert William Lawrence (1807–1833), who encouraged his interest in botany and placed him in touch with Sir William Jackson Hooker and Dr Lindley, with whom he corresponded for many years. In 1836 Gunn was appointed police magistrate at Circular Head. From there he visited Port Phillip and Western Port and also traveled much in Tasmania. He became assistant police magistrate at Hobart Town in 1838, and in 1839 private secretary to Sir John Franklin and clerk of the executive and legislative councils. In 1841 he gave up these appointments to take charge of the estates of William Effingham Lawrence, and spent much time investigating the flora of Tasmania. But his interests were not confined to botany; he became a general scientist and made collections of mammals, birds, reptiles and mollusca, for the British Museum.

Taking up the study of geology, Gunn was employed by the government to report on mining fields, and also on the general resources of the colony. In 1864 Gunn was one of the three Australian commissioners tasked by the Government of New Zealand with choosing a new capital for that country. Together with Francis Murphy (Victoria) and Joseph Docker (New South Wales), he recommended for the capital to move from Auckland to Wellington. Subsequently, he became recorder of titles at Launceston, holding this position until 1876 when he retired owing to ill health. Gunn died at Newstead, near Launceston, after a long illness, on 13 March 1881. He became a fellow of the Linnean Society in 1850, and was elected a fellow of the Royal Society, London, in 1854.

Gunn was a first-rate botanist and general scientist. Sir Joseph Dalton Hooker, who dedicated his Flora Tasmaniae to Gunn, and another Tasmanian botanist, William Archer (1820–74), speaking of Gunn in his Introductory Essay said: ‘There are few Tasmanian plants that Mr Gunn has not seen alive, noted their habits in a living state, and collected large suites of specimens with singular tact and judgment. These have all been transmitted to England . . . accompanied with notes that display remarkable powers of observation, and a facility for seizing important characters in the physiognomy of plants, such as few experienced botanists possess’.

Although so competent, Gunn published little. With Dr. John E. Gray, he was responsible for a paper "Notices accompanying a Collection of Quadrupeds and Fish from Van Diemen's Land", and he was the author of a few papers on the geology and botany of that island. When private secretary to Sir John Franklin he assisted in founding, and was editor of, the Tasmanian Journal of Natural Science, which recorded papers read at government house. From these beginnings sprang the Royal Society of Tasmania. The Tasmanian Journal was succeeded by the Proceedings of the Royal Society of Van Diemen's Land, in which some of Gunn's few papers appeared. He also served in both houses of the Tasmanian Parliament between 1855 and 1860. He was much liked and respected and may be ranked as the most eminent of Tasmanian botanists. Gunn died on 13 March 1881 at Newstead House and was buried in the Presbyterian cemetery, Launceston. Gunn is commemorated by the genera Gunniopsis and Gunnia, and many species.

References

External links
 
 
 
 

19th-century Australian botanists
1808 births
1881 deaths
Botanists active in Australia
Fellows of the Linnean Society of London
Fellows of the Royal Society
Members of the Tasmanian Legislative Council
Members of the Tasmanian House of Assembly
19th-century Australian politicians
19th-century Australian public servants